Pilodeudorix pasteon is a butterfly in the family Lycaenidae first described by Hamilton Herbert Druce in 1910. It is found in Cameroon, the Democratic Republic of the Congo (from the north-eastern part of the country to the Ituri Rainforest) and western Uganda.

References

External links
Die Gross-Schmetterlinge der Erde 13: Die Afrikanischen Tagfalter. Plate XIII 66 b

Butterflies described in 1910
Deudorigini